The Burghead Bulls are a group of carved Pictish stones from the site of Burghead Fort in Moray, Scotland, each featuring an incised image of a bull. Up to 30 were discovered during the demolition of the fort to create the town of Burghead in the 19th century, but most were lost when they were used to build the harbour quayside. Six remain: two in the Visitor Centre in Burghead, two in Elgin Museum, one in the National Museum of Scotland in Edinburgh, and one in the British Museum in London.

Interpretation of the stones' original role has varied. Some scholars have suggested they were displayed on the fort's ramparts as symbols of power; others have seen them as having a votive role in a frieze as part of a pagan fertility cult; while others argue they were standing stones lining a processional route through the ramparts, a role suggested by their likely original kite-shaped form. The Bulls probably represent an early pre-Christian phase of the fort's existence in the 7th or late 6th centuries, while the later shrine panels and cross-slabs represented by the Burghead sculpture fragments indicate the presence of an Early Christian centre during a later period, as the association between the church and royal power grew from the 7th century onwards.

References

Bibliography
 

Pictish stones